Neolithodes is a genus of king crabs, in the family Lithodidae. They are found in all major oceans, both in high and low latitudes. They are fairly large to large crabs that typically are reddish in color and spiny, although the size of these spines varies depending on species (from long in species like N. grimaldii to very short in species like N. flindersi, and tending to be more pronounced in small than in large individuals).

Various sessile organisms such as barnacles are sometimes attached to their carapace and legs, and small commensal amphipods may live in their carapace. They are occasionally the victims of parasitic snailfish of the genus Careproctus, which lay their egg mass in the gill chamber of the crab, forming a mobile "home" until they hatch. Conversely, some juvenile Neolithodes have a commensal relationship with Scotoplanes sea cucumbers. To protect itself from large predators, the young crab hides under the sea cucumber.

The word Neolithodes derives from the Greek , meaning new, and Lithodes, a closely related genus of king crab. The name of the latter genus originates from the Latin , meaning stone like.

Species
The following species are in this genus:

Neolithodes agassizii (Smith, 1882)
Neolithodes asperrimus (Barnard, 1947)
Neolithodes brodiei (Dawson & Yaldwyn, 1970)
Neolithodes bronwynae (Ahyong, 2010)
Neolithodes capensis (Stebbing, 1905)
Neolithodes diomedeae (Benedict, 1894)
Neolithodes duhameli (Macpherson, 2004)
Neolithodes flindersi (Ahyong, 2010)
Neolithodes grimaldii (Milne-Edwards & Bouvier, 1894)
Neolithodes indicus (Padate, Cubelio & Takeda, 2020)
Neolithodes nipponensis (Sakai 1971)
Neolithodes vinogradovi (Macpherson, 1988)
Neolithodes yaldwyni (Ahyong & Dawson, 2006)

References

External links 

King crabs
Taxa named by Eugène Louis Bouvier
Decapod genera